Song of the Saurials is a 313-page Forgotten Realms paperback fantasy novel published by TSR Inc. in 1991, written by Kate Novak and Jeff Grubb.

Plot
This novel is the final book of the Finders Stone Trilogy. Akabar bel Akash has visions that the god Moander is returning to the Realms, so he brings the band of adventurers back together again to counter this threat.

Characters
 Alias
 Olive Ruskettle
 Akabar bel Akash
 Dragonbait
 Finder Wyvernspur
 Grypht
 Elminster
 Moander

Reception
One reviewer called the book "a serviceable but ultimately disappointing finale to what was otherwise an excellent couple of books." The reviewer pointed to the clichéd start to the novel, and the use of exposition to reveal the plot as the weakest parts of the book. Other concerns were the slow pace as the point of view switches back and forth from various groups of protagonists, and the use of the magical finder's stone as a deus ex machina device. The reviewer concluded by giving the book a grade of C, saying, "the execution is just so flat and sloppy that I can’t help but wonder what went wrong here. A pity, really."

On the RPG.net site, readers have given this book an aggregate rating of 5.00 out of 10, ranking it #12,814th; both of these are significantly lower than the first two books of the Finder's Stone trilogy.

See also

Azure Bonds - 1st Book in Finders Stone Trilogy
The Wyvern's Spur - 2nd Book in Finders Stone Trilogy
Masquerades, a follow-on sequel depicting the further adventures of the Azure Bonds main characters.

References

External links
 Original Cover Art by Clyde Caldwell

1991 American novels
American fantasy novels
Forgotten Realms novels
Novels by Jeff Grubb